My Booky Wook is a memoir, written by English comedian and actor Russell Brand, published in 2007 by Hodder & Stoughton. It was released in North America and Australia in 2009 by HarperCollins Publishers.

Summary
This "warts and all" account of Brand's life follows, in vivid detail, the star's life from his troubled childhood in Gray's End Close, Essex, to his first taste for fame in Stage School up to his turbulent drug addiction and his triumphant rise to fame from RE:Brand to Big Brother's Big Mouth to Hollywood.

Chapters
My Booky Wook is divided into four sections. The title itself is in the style of the fictional Nadsat language from A Clockwork Orange; Brand explained the reference during his appearance on Have I Got News For You in December 2007.

Critical reception

The book garnered mostly positive reviews. The Sun called it "candid, funny and moving." The Observer  claimed it was "better written and more entertaining than any number of the celebrity autobiographies that clog the shelves of bookshops." However, some reviews were less complimentary: Private Eye Magazine called it "dismal and masturbatory." The book won the Biography of the year at the 2008 British Book Awards and the Outstanding Literary Achievement at the 2009 Spike Guys' Choice Awards.

Origins of book title

The book's title was first mentioned on 24 September 2006, during an episode of Brand's former radio show, The Russell Brand Show.

Film adaptation
Brand planned to star as himself in a film adaptation of the book, originally scheduled to be filmed by British director Michael Winterbottom at the end of 2008 or early in 2009. The project has since been shelved by Brand, who did not want American audiences to learn of his "chequered past" without reading the book first.

Sales
The book has sold more than 600,000 copies since it was released.

References

External links
 My Booky Wook press release
 Book review by the Sunday Times.

2007 non-fiction books
Books by Russell Brand
British memoirs
Hodder & Stoughton books
Show business memoirs